WCCB (channel 18) is a television station in Charlotte, North Carolina, United States, affiliated with The CW. It serves as the flagship station of locally based Bahakel Communications. WCCB's studios are located just outside Uptown Charlotte, off Independence Boulevard (across from Bojangles' Coliseum), and its transmitter is located in Newell, an unincorporated area of Mecklenburg County just northeast of the Charlotte city limits.

History

Beginnings
WCCB traces its roots to WAYS-TV, a primary ABC and secondary NBC affiliate, which signed on the air on January 5, 1954. Broadcasting on UHF channel 36, it was North Carolina's second UHF station (after WNAO-TV in Raleigh), as well as the second television station in the Charlotte market. It was owned by George Dowdy and his company, Inter-City Advertising, owners of WAYS radio (610 AM, now WFNZ); Intercity had filed for channel 11 prior to the 1948 TV freeze, amended its application to specify channel 9 in 1952, then sought channel 36 instead to avoid a comparative hearing. Hugh Deadwyler became co-owner of the station later that year and acquired the station outright after buying Intercity's interest in 1955; it sold for $4 and the assumption of liabilities. With the sale, WAYS-TV became WQMC.

Even then, like most UHF stations, it was only viewable on most sets with an expensive UHF converter. Television set manufacturers were not required to include UHF tuners at the time; this would not change until Congress passed the All-Channel Receiver Act in 1964. As a result, it made almost no headway against CBS affiliate WBTV (channel 3), which continued to cherry-pick certain NBC programs.

The station went dark on March 15, 1955, in what was intended to be a temporary hiatus while it underwent technical improvements, including the construction of a more powerful transmitter at a new location. However, Deadwyler was unable to get the station back on track. In March 1956, a lawsuit was filed seeking the placement of channel 36 into receivership; the complainant was Inter-City Advertising, who claimed that Deadwyler had not paid any of the $86,220 debt to Radio Corporation of America that was transferred to him and for which RCA was seeking payment from Inter-City.

WUTV
Deadwyler organized Century Advertising Co., Inc., which planned to relaunch channel 36 in 1957 as ABC affiliate WUTV, with a more powerful signal than its predecessor. However, these plans were not successful, as Charlotte's second VHF station, WSOC-TV (channel 9), signed on the air that April as an NBC affiliate. Even with the stronger signal, WUTV would have still been all but unviewable in most of the market. In addition, most of the market (particularly the western portion) got a fairly decent signal from WLOS-TV out of Asheville; which was included in the Charlotte television listings for many years and even ran ads for its programs in Charlotte area newspapers.
   
After four years of delays, Century Advertising relaunched WUTV on September 5, 1961. The station broadcast non-commercial educational programming from the University of North Carolina and Charlotte-Mecklenburg Schools, though it retained a commercial license. A full new facility was constructed behind the Charlotte Coliseum at 1 Television Place—still home to WCCB today—including a new transmitter site. WUTV's effective radiated power was 206kW visual. In the meantime, Century pursued the allocation of VHF channel 6 to Charlotte.

WUTV, however, was not capable of live programming. The Charlotte–Mecklenburg School Board began to pursue the construction of a full educational TV station on reserved channel 42, buying the equipment of a failed station in Fort Pierce, Florida. While channel 36 might have remained on air until the school board was ready to launch WTVI, Century Advertising decided to ask the educational groups to pay rent in early 1963 after having initially verbally agreed to a three-year rent-free contract. They opted to pay to finish out the 1962–1963 school year but no further, causing WUTV to go silent May 16, 1963.

Relaunch
In June 1964, businessman Cy Bahakel—who moved from Roanoke, Virginia, to Charlotte—bought the dormant channel 36 license and facilities from Century for $175,000. An addition would be made to the studio building as part of Bahakel's efforts to return the station to the air.

Bahakel returned the station to air on November 1 of that year as WCCB-TV (for "Charlotte Cy Bahakel"). The call letters had recently been used by what is now WNCF in Montgomery, Alabama, which was acquired by Bahakel earlier that year. Logically, it should have returned as a full-time ABC affiliate. Charlotte had only two network-affiliated stations, CBS affiliate WBTV and NBC affiliate WSOC-TV. It had been large enough to support three full network affiliates since the 1950s. However, WCCB's signal was scarcely stronger than that of its predecessor, at 200,000 watts, essentially limiting its coverage area to Charlotte proper and its inner suburbs. The FCC also began requiring television sets to have all-channel tuning only a few months before, and most Charlotte households did not yet have UHF-capable sets. Under the circumstances, ABC decided to retain its secondary affiliation agreements with WBTV and WSOC. WCCB was forced to settle for a secondary affiliation with all three networks, airing most of the network shows that WBTV and WSOC chose to turn down. For the next three years, it split both NBC and ABC's programming roughly equally with WSOC; a few ABC shows also continued to air on WBTV, and WCCB aired some CBS programs in turn.

On November 1, 1966, WCCB moved from channel 36 to channel 18, broadcasting from a new tower located on Newell Hickory Grove Road in northeast Charlotte. The new channel 18 facility was capable of 1.35 million watts of power, giving WCCB a coverage area comparable to those of WBTV and WSOC-TV. In 1967, WSOC-TV dropped all ABC programming and became a full-time NBC affiliate, allowing WCCB-TV to be the exclusive ABC affiliate.  It took Charlotte 18 years to finally gain full service from all three major networks of the time.  The state's largest market got a full-fledged ABC affiliate after the state's two smallest markets, Greenville/New Bern/Washington and Wilmington, received ABC affiliates of their own (WCTI-TV and WWAY respectively).  However, despite the stronger signal and the first consistent airing of all network programs in Charlotte TV history, WCCB-TV remained a distant third in the ratings.

In 1977, ABC announced that it had lured away WSOC-TV, then an NBC affiliate, to be its new outlet in the Charlotte market beginning July 1, 1978, replacing WCCB-TV. That decision set off a two-station showdown between WCCB and WRET-TV channel 36 for the NBC affiliation in Charlotte. WCCB, which had a news department (unlike WRET-TV), was seen as the favorite; sources at NBC were said to see channel 36 as their last option, behind WCCB, with its stronger signal, and WBTV, which the network was trying to woo from CBS to no avail.

WRET owner Ted Turner, however, made a promise to NBC that it would not pass up when he promised the network that, if it affiliated with WRET-TV, he would spend $2.5 million on station improvements, including $1 million to start up a local news service within one year; the proposed expansion would employ 22 people, compared to 26 at WSOC and 12 at WCCB. On April 29, news broke that WRET-TV had been selected for the NBC affiliation, with the network preferring it to WCCB based on Turner's turnaround record with the station and his ownership of the Atlanta Braves and Atlanta Hawks.

With the decision, WCCB became an independent station. It bought a large chunk of syndicated programming from WRET, including cartoons and older sitcoms. For a time in the late 1970s and early 1980s, after-school cartoons (Afternoon Express) were hosted by the costumed Sonic Man space alien character, played by Larry Sprinkle, who has been a staple in Charlotte radio and television, including serving as a weather anchor for channel 36 since the 1980s. WCCB carried on for almost a decade as a typical UHF general entertainment independent station.

Fox affiliation 

In 1986, WCCB became the last station in a top-50 market to join Fox as one of the upstart network's charter affiliates, since it was doing so well in the ratings as an independent. WCCB affiliated with the network when it launched on October 6 of that year. For most of the next quarter-century, WCCB was one of the strongest Fox stations in the country – even claiming to be the highest-rated Fox affiliate in the nation during the 2008–09 television season. The station reaped a major windfall after the NFL moved its National Football Conference television package from CBS to Fox in 1994. By coincidence, this made WCCB the unofficial "home" station of the Carolina Panthers upon the team's 1995 inception. WCCB carried most Panthers regular season games during the team's first 18 seasons, and later acquired the local rights to the team's preseason games from WBTV. Panthers games had generally been the most-watched programs in the market during the NFL football season. After having branded itself as "TV18" since sign-on, WCCB changed its branding to "Fox 18" in 1988 and then to "Fox Charlotte" in 2002.

Cy Bahakel was an original partner in the NBA's Charlotte Hornets, and WCCB served as the team's flagship station for the Hornets' first four seasons in Charlotte from 1988 to 1992. Bahakel owned WCCB until his death on April 20, 2006, with his family taking over the duties of running the station (and its parent company, Bahakel Communications) since that point. In 2007, WCCB's website switched to Fox Interactive Media's "MyFox" platform (which was originally intended for Fox's owned-and-operated stations), with the domain transitioning from foxcharlotte.tv to myfoxcharlotte.com; however, the station de-emphasized the "MyFox" corporate reference within a year, with the URL becoming known simply as foxcharlotte.com. The revamped page continued to use the "MyFox" webpage template (sans the "MyFox" branding) until 2010, when Broadcast Interactive Media became WCCB's site host.

Loss of Fox affiliation and switch to The CW
On January 28, 2013, Fox Television Stations announced the purchase of CW affiliate WJZY (channel 46) and MyNetworkTV affiliate WMYT-TV (channel 55) from Capitol Broadcasting Company for $18 million. While WCCB had been one of the network's strongest affiliates, Fox had been looking to buy a station in what had become the 25th-largest market. It also wanted to own as many stations in NFC markets as possible; at the time Charlotte was the only NFC market in the Eastern Time Zone where the Fox station was only an affiliate. Another likely factor in the purchase was an option by Fox to purchase the Raleigh–Durham CW/MyNetworkTV duopoly of WLFL and WRDC from Sinclair Broadcast Group, which would have resulted in WRAZ (a sister station to WJZY and WMYT at the time) losing its Fox affiliation.

On April 18, one day after Fox completed its purchase of WJZY and WMYT, WCCB announced that it would replace WJZY as Charlotte's CW affiliate on July 1. On May 9, it was reported that Bahakel  reserved the domain CharlottesCW.com for two years. Given the station's strong performance as a Fox affiliate and its half-century of service to the area (in its current incarnation), WCCB was expected to become one of the ten strongest CW affiliates in the nation when it formally joined that network. The old "Fox Charlotte" logo remained at the entrance to the station's studios until mid-May when it was replaced with signage bearing the "Charlotte CW" logo.

WCCB's relationship with Fox formally ended after 27 years on June 30, with American Dad! being the final Fox program to air on the station. With the loss of WCCB's Fox affiliation, Fox no longer has any charter affiliates remaining in North Carolina. WCCB formally rolled out its new on-air branding and logo the next afternoon, July 1, 2013, its first day as a CW affiliate. However, most verbal references to the station are to its call letters, with any CW references used obliquely (in the manner of "WCCB, Charlotte's CW"). It marked the first time in a quarter-century that the station has used its call letters on a permanent basis in its branding.

Programming
In addition to the CW network schedule, syndicated programming on WCCB includes The Drew Barrymore Show, Maury, Black-ish, and 2 Broke Girls, among others. WCCB was Charlotte's home of first-run episodes of The Simpsons from its December 1989 debut as a Christmas special until the station was forced to succumb its Fox affiliation to WJZY in 2013. WCCB in the past was also one of the few stations broadcasting Siskel & Ebert that was affiliated with Fox, with others including WLFL, Fox's Raleigh–Durham affiliate from 1986 to 1998 and Fox's New York City flagship station WNYW.
WCCB remained home to Panthers preseason football games until losing them to WSOC-TV for the 2019 season. It also began airing Charlotte 49ers college football games in September 2013, with WCCB carrying any 49er home games not carried by Conference USA's national and regional television partners.

News operation
WCCB presently broadcasts 30 hours of locally produced newscasts each week (with 5½ hours each weekday, 1½ hours on Saturdays and one hour on Sundays); in addition, the station produces WCCB News Got Game, a half-hour sports highlight program that airs on Sunday evenings following the 10 p.m. newscast. WCCB's studio facilities served as a production facility for WOLO-TV's newscasts from 2002 to 2005 in one of the first instances of centralcasting; studio segments for WOLO's newscasts returned to Columbia afterward.

WCCB aired newscasts at various times between 1964 until it lost its ABC affiliation in 1978. It reduced its news department to a skeleton staff after becoming an independent station and did not carry a regularly scheduled newscast again until 1994, when it began airing a nightly 10:00 p.m. news program produced by WSOC-TV. In 1999, WCCB announced plans to launch its own news department. That summer, WSOC-TV relocated its prime time newscast to its sister independent station WAXN-TV (channel 64). WCNC then temporarily took over production of the late-evening newscast on WCCB until the launch of the station's in-house news department on January 1, 2000, with the debut of a half-hour 10:00 p.m. newscast. Ironically, the WCNC-produced newscast on WCCB drew a larger audience at the time than the newscasts that actually aired on WCNC.

On September 28, 2008, beginning with the 10 p.m. newscast, WCCB became the second television station in the Charlotte market to begin broadcasting its local newscasts in high definition. The upgrade included the debut of a brand new HD-ready news set. On February 4, 2013, Ken White, who had served as WCCB's news director since the 2000 inception of its current news department, was reassigned to Jackson, Tennessee sister station WBBJ-TV as its interim news director; assistant news director Angela Robbins was appointed as White's replacement at WCCB.

After WCCB became a CW affiliate on July 1, 2013, it retained its weekday morning and nightly prime time newscasts. On November 9, 2013, WCCB debuted half-hour 6:00 p.m. newscasts on Saturday and Sunday evenings, making it one of the few television stations to have carried an early evening newscast on weekends without an existing newscast in that daypart on weekdays (WCCB handles master control responsibilities for WOLO's weeknight 6:00 and 11:00 p.m. newscasts.

Notable former on-air staff
 Anna Kooiman – weekday morning host (now at Fox News Channel)
 Beth Troutman – weekday morning anchor

Technical information

Subchannels
The station's digital signal is multiplexed:

Previously, a standard-definition simulcast of the station's main channel was carried on its second digital subchannel; this simulcast feed was later upgraded to high-definition with the addition of SAP and DVS audio channels. In June 2012, the SAP/DVS feed was added to the main channel as well. The second subchannel was removed in December 2013, as well as the SAP/DVS feed from the main channel which was unused at that time by the CW (it has since returned due to FCC description and weather warning read-out requirements, along with it being utilized by the CW for One Magnificent Morning and a Spanish dub of Jane the Virgin); digital subchannel 18.2 would return in April 2014 carrying QVC's "Over the Air" simulcast service. On July 21, 2014, it was announced that Antenna TV would be added to the second subchannel on August 15, 2014, bringing it back to the Charlotte market after being dropped by its previous affiliate WJZY. Antenna TV began airing that day, replacing QVC Over the Air, which went to a new fourth digital subchannel. On August 29, 2019, the Home Shopping Network was added on 18.7; this was followed by Dabl, which premiered on September 9 on 18.6. On January 8, 2020, Cozi TV was added to 18.8. On October 27, 2020, Antenna TV (18.2) and Start TV (18.5) swapped subchannels.

Until March 1, 2011, WCCB carried a feed of its weather radar on its third subchannel, which provided NOAA Weather Radio feeds from Spencer Mountain, North Carolina and Columbia and Rock Hill, South Carolina through SAP. On that date, MeTV replaced the weather radar feed after having the start date of its affiliation delayed for a month due to contractual issues. The weather radar feed remained available through WCCB's mobile DTV service, but this has since been discontinued. The Spencer Mountain and Rock Hill NOAA feeds were initially retained on MeTV through SAP. The Spencer Mountain feed was removed in mid-2012, and the Rock Hill feed was removed in December 2013.

Translator

Analog-to-digital conversion
WCCB shut down its analog signal, over UHF channel 18, on June 12, 2009, the official date in which full-power television stations in the United States transitioned from analog to digital broadcasts under federal mandate. The station's digital signal remained on its pre-transition UHF channel 27. Through the use of PSIP, digital television receivers display the station's virtual channel as its former UHF analog channel 18. On February 4, 2010, WCCB signed on a translator located near Connelly Springs on UHF channel 20, W20DD-D. The translator was licensed to Marion as W08BJ. It was purchased from WSPA-TV and moved to Smith Mountain.

Out-of-market cable carriage
In recent years, WCCB has been carried on cable in several areas outside the Charlotte television market, including on cable systems within the Asheville and Greensboro–Winston-Salem–High Point markets, the Columbia, South Carolina market, and the Tri-Cities market in Tennessee and Virginia.

References

External links
WCCBCharlotte.com – WCCB-TV official website
MeTVCharlotte.com – MeTV Charlotte official website

Bahakel Communications
CCB
The CW affiliates
Antenna TV affiliates
MeTV affiliates
Start TV affiliates
Dabl affiliates
Cozi TV affiliates
Television channels and stations established in 1954
1954 establishments in North Carolina
National Football League primary television stations